Sir Simon Montford (died circa 30 January 1495) was an English Lord of several manors, who was executed for treason. 

Simon Montford was the son and heir of Sir Baldwin Montfort, Knt, of Coleshill Manor, Warwickshire (1410-c1458) by his spouse Joan, daughter of Sir Richard Vernon, Speaker of the House of Commons. Baldwin was the first to drop the "de" from their surname.

Lord of Manors
He inherited Coleshill (in Arden) Manor, entering into possession of the manor before 4 March 1461. He also held the manor of Kingshurst (in Coleshill), and Avon Dasset, and others.  Sir Edward Grey, Viscount Lisle, at his death in 1492, owned pasture and woodland in Alcotenhall (a manor in Coleshill) which was held of this "Sir Simon Montfort, the Lord of Coleshill".

Career
In 1465 Montfort was found guilty of insurrection and various misdeeds, for which he was pardoned the next year. He was retained by King Edward IV to serve in the French wars with five spearmen and sixty archers.  In 1469-70 he was Lieutenant of Carisbrooke Castle on the Isle of Wight. In April 1471 he was appointed sheriff of the counties of Warwick and Leicester. He was subsequently charged with supporting the rebellion of Perkin Warbeck, one of the pretenders during the reign of King Henry VII, tried at the London Guildhall on 30 January 1495, found guilty, attainted, and executed, his estates forfeited. Coleshill Manor was awarded to Simon Digby. (The attainder on Kingshurst Manor and lands was reversed in 1534 for his grandson Thomas Montfort, but without restoration of Coleshill).

Family
Montford married Anne (b.c1440), daughter of Sir Richard Verney, Knt., of Compton Verney, Warwickshire. They had three sons and two daughters.

His grandson, Simon Mountford, was a Member of Parliament.

References
 The Visitation of Worcestershire 1569 edited by W. P. W. Phillimore, M.A., BCL., London, 1888, p.97.
 The Visitation of Essex 1552  edited by Walter C. Metcalfe, F.S.A., London, 1878, p.85.
 The Visitation of Essex 1612  edited by Walter C. Metcalfe, F.S.A., London, 1878, p.256.
 Plantagenet Ancestry by Douglas Richardson, Baltimore, Md., 2004, p.514.
 Magna Carta Ancestry by Douglas Richardson, Baltimore, Md., 2005, p.584.

Year of birth missing
15th-century births
1495 deaths
People from Coleshill, Warwickshire
People of the Tudor period
English knights
English rebels
Executed English people
People executed under Henry VII of England
15th-century executions by England
People executed for treason